Anthony Raymond White (born June 16, 1954) is a Canadian former professional ice hockey forward.

Career 
Drafted in 1974 by both the Washington Capitals of the National Hockey League and the New England Whalers of the World Hockey Association. White was a member of the Capitals and the Minnesota North Stars. He later played with the Oklahoma City Stars and ended his career with Fuessen EV in Germany.

Career statistics

1954 births
Canadian ice hockey forwards
Dayton Gems players
EV Füssen players
Hershey Bears players
Ice hockey people from Newfoundland and Labrador
Kitchener Rangers players
Living people
Minnesota North Stars players
New England Whalers draft picks
Oklahoma City Stars players
Springfield Falcons players
Washington Capitals draft picks
Washington Capitals players

References

External links 
 
 Profile at hockeydrraftcentral.com